Fernand Picard (April 3, 1917 – October 1, 1986) was a Canadian politician.

Born in Montreal, Quebec, Picard was elected to the Legislative Assembly of Quebec in 1966 for Olier. A Liberal, he was re-elected in 1970 and in 1973 in the riding of Viau. He did not run in 1976.

He died in Montreal in 1986.

References

1917 births
1986 deaths
Politicians from Montreal
Quebec Liberal Party MNAs